Round 13 is the thirteenth studio album by the Swiss hard rock band Krokus, and the only album to feature Welsh vocalist Carl Sentance, formerly of Persian Risk and the Geezer Butler Band. It includes a cover of "Heya" by J. J. Light (a.k.a. Jim Stallings from Sir Douglas Quintet).

The album was mixed by Tony Platt.

Track listing 
All songs by Fernando von Arb, except where indicated.

"Heya" (Bob Markley, Jim Stallings) - 4:16
"Money Back" (von Arb, Many Maurer) - 4:31
"Break Free" - 3:52
"Guitar Rules" - 2:58
"Blood Comes Easy" - 4:51
"Suck My Guitar" - 3:55
"Gipsy Love" - 4:44
"Whitchhunt" - 3:59
"Backstabber" - 4:16
"Wild Times" - 3:17

Personnel
Band members
Carl Sentance - vocals
Fernando von Arb - guitars, bass, piano, backing vocals, producer
Chris Lauper - guitars
Many Maurer - bass, guitars, backing vocals, producer
Peter Haas - drums, percussion

Additional musicians
Andy Portmann, Chris Egger, Claudio Matteo - backing vocals

Production
Tony Platt - mixing, mastering
Ray Staff - mastering

Charts

References

1999 albums
Angel Air albums
Krokus (band) albums